The 2004–05 season was Real Madrid C.F.'s 74th season in La Liga. This article lists all matches that the club played in the 2004–05 season, and also shows statistics of the club's players.

Real Madrid finished the season trophyless for the first time since 1995–96.

First-team squad

Left club during season

Reserve squad

Transfers

In

Total spending:  €59,500,000

Out

 
Total income:  €0

Pre-season and friendlies

Competitions

Overview

La Liga

League table

Results summary

Result round by round

Matches

Copa del Rey

Round of 64

Round of 32

Round of 16

UEFA Champions League

Third qualifying round

Group stage

Round of 16

Statistics

Players statistics

References

Real Madrid
Real Madrid CF seasons